Avraham-Haim Shag (born Avraham-Haim Zwebner on 17 July 1883, died 6 December 1958) was an Israeli politician who served as a member of the Assembly of Representatives and the Knesset.

Biography
Born in Jerusalem in the Ottoman Empire, Shag was educated at the Torat Haim yeshiva. He later headed a yeshiva in Jerusalem, and was chairman of the city's religious council in 1936.

He was amongst the founders of Kfar Saba, and also aided the foundation of the Bayit VeGan, Geula and Romema neighborhoods of Jerusalem. In addition, he helped establish the Mizrachi movement in Mandate Palestine, and was a member of its bureau in Jerusalem between 1919 and 1921. He also became a member of the Assembly of Representatives

In 1949, he was elected to the first Knesset on the United Religious Front list, an alliance of the four major religious parties. However, he lost his seat two years later in the 1951 elections. He died in 1958.

External links

1883 births
1958 deaths
People from Jerusalem
Jews in Ottoman Palestine
Jews in Mandatory Palestine
Members of the Assembly of Representatives (Mandatory Palestine)
Members of the 1st Knesset (1949–1951)
Mizrachi (political party) politicians
United Religious Front politicians
Rabbis in Jerusalem